Villeroy is a municipality in the Centre-du-Québec region of the province of Quebec in Canada.

References

http://www.municipalite-villeroy.ca/

External links
 Villeroy Cranberry Festival

Municipalities in Quebec
Incorporated places in Centre-du-Québec